Hans Blume  (16 November 1887 – 5 January 1978) was a Dutch footballer who played as a forward.

International career
Blume made his debut and played his sole game for the Netherlands on 1 April 1907 against England, immediately scoring a goal.

Personal life
He emigrated to Thailand in the 1930s and later to Australia. He died in 1978 in a town near Sydney.

See also
 List of Dutch international footballers

References

Sources
 Verkamman, Van der Steen, Volkers (1999) De Internationals, de historie van Oranje. Amsterdam, Weekbladpers BV/Voetbal International.

External links

1887 births
1978 deaths
People from Semarang
Dutch footballers
Association football forwards
Netherlands international footballers
Dutch emigrants to Australia
Quick 1888 players